is a Japanese construction company specialized in construction of condominium units. From 1968 to 2015, the company built a total of around 580,000 condominium units, which is approximately 10% of the total number of condominium units on the market in Japan.

The company is highly vertically integrated, with all of the lifecycle of condominium construction and maintenance handled by the company or its subsidiaries.

On October 1, 2015, Haseko Corporation was included in the Nikkei 225 stock market index.

References

External links

Official Website 

Construction and civil engineering companies of Japan
Construction and civil engineering companies based in Tokyo
Construction and civil engineering companies established in 1937
Companies listed on the Tokyo Stock Exchange
Japanese brands
Japanese companies established in 1937